She Goes to War is a 1929 silent film directed by Henry King and starring Eleanor Boardman. The film was released a year after Boardman had starred in The Crowd.

Cast 
 Eleanor Boardman
 John Holland
 Margaret Seddon
 Eulalie Jensen
 Edmund Burns
 Alma Rubens
 Yola d'Avril

External links

1929 films
1920s war drama films
American black-and-white films
American war drama films
American silent feature films
Films directed by Henry King
Western Front (World War I) films
Films with screenplays by Rupert Hughes
1929 drama films
1920s American films
Silent American drama films
Silent war drama films
1920s English-language films